Jamill Amin Smith (born February 23, 1991) is an American football wide receiver, who is currently a free agent. He played college football at Ball State.

Early years
Smith played high school football for the Southside High School Rebels of Muncie, Indiana, earning four letters. He helped team to an 8–4 record and was named all-state his senior year. He also helped the team advance to the sectional finals as a junior and senior. Smith earned All-Olympic Athletic Conference honors his junior and senior seasons. He passed for 2,459 yards and 20 touchdowns while rushing for 1,724 yards and 28 touchdowns as a senior. He set school records for most passing yards in a game, season and career. He also set the school record for most career touchdowns in rushing and passing. Smith played baseball for the Rebels, recording a .429 batting average his senior year.

College career
Smith played for the Ball State Cardinals of Ball State University from 2010 to 2013. He was redshirted in 2009. He accumulated career totals of 1,988 kickoff return yards, 173 receptions and seventeen receiving touchdowns. Smith earned All-Mid-American Conference Second Team honors as a kick returner in 2013. He also garnered All-MAC Third Team recognition as a wide receiver and punt returner in 2013. He earned All-MAC First Team honors as a wide receiver as well as All-MAC Third Team recognition as a punt and kick returner in 2012. Smith also garnered All-MAC Second Team accolades in 2011.

Professional career
Smith was signed by the Ottawa Redblacks of the Canadian Football League (CFL) on May 29, 2014. He was released by the Redblacks on June 19, 2015. He was signed to the Redblacks' practice roster on October 20 and promoted to the team's active roster on October 23, 2015.

Smith signed with the Georgia Firebirds of the National Arena League (NAL) on June 1, 2017. He played in 3 games for the Firebirds in 2017, catching 8 passes for 70 yards and 1 touchdown. He also returned 2 kicks for 54 yards.

He signed with the Edmonton Eskimos on August 20, 2017. Over two seasons he appeared in 9 games, primarily used as a punt and kick returner.

He signed with the Montreal Alouettes on September 24, 2019.

References

External links
Ottawa Redblacks bio
College stats
NFL Draft Scout

Living people
1991 births
American football wide receivers
Canadian football wide receivers
African-American players of American football
African-American players of Canadian football
Ball State Cardinals football players
Ottawa Redblacks players
Georgia Firebirds players
Edmonton Elks players
Players of American football from Indiana
Sportspeople from Muncie, Indiana
Canadian football return specialists
21st-century African-American sportspeople